Yoandri (or Yoandris)  Betanzos Francis (born February 15, 1982, in Santiago de Cuba) is a Cuban athlete competing in the triple jump.

Early life and career
They say, he was almost born on the track: His mother, Cuban sprinter Amarailis Francis, suffered from a heavy abdominal pain during her daily practice, and was immediately transferred to a hospital in her hometown Santiago de Cuba.  A couple of hours later, she gave birth to her son.

Later, he moved to Ciego de Ávila, the hometown of his father, Cuban boxer Álvaro Betanzos, and started his sports career following in his father's footsteps as a boxer.  After about a year, he changed to athletics, firstly competing as a high jumper. In 1993, he became Cuban national champion in his age group setting a new record of 1.86 m, beating the old mark set by Javier Sotomayor.  As he was not tall enough, his coaches proposed to change to triple jump.

Personal bests
His personal best outdoor jump is 17.65 metres, achieved in April 2009 in Havana. As of 21 June 2013, this result places him sixth on the all-time Cuban performers list, behind Yoelbi Quesada, Lázaro Betancourt, Aliecer Urrutia, Pedro Pichardo, and Alexis Copello.

Achievements

References

External links

Tilastopaja biography
Ecured biography (in Spanish)

1982 births
Living people
Cuban male triple jumpers
Olympic athletes of Cuba
Athletes (track and field) at the 2003 Pan American Games
Athletes (track and field) at the 2004 Summer Olympics
Athletes (track and field) at the 2007 Pan American Games
Athletes (track and field) at the 2011 Pan American Games
Athletes (track and field) at the 2012 Summer Olympics
Sportspeople from Santiago de Cuba
World Athletics Championships medalists
Pan American Games gold medalists for Cuba
Pan American Games silver medalists for Cuba
Pan American Games bronze medalists for Cuba
Pan American Games medalists in athletics (track and field)
Central American and Caribbean Games gold medalists for Cuba
Competitors at the 2006 Central American and Caribbean Games
Central American and Caribbean Games medalists in athletics
Competitors at the 2001 Summer Universiade
Medalists at the 2003 Pan American Games
Medalists at the 2007 Pan American Games
Medalists at the 2011 Pan American Games